Ski jumping at the 2011 Asian Winter Games was held at International Ski Jump Complex in Almaty, Kazakhstan. The three events were scheduled for January 31–February 4, 2011 with three events contested — all men's.

This was the second time ski jumping was officially added as a medal sport after being included in previous Winter Asiad programs only as a demonstration sport.

Schedule

Medalists

Medal table

Participating nations
A total of 19 athletes from 4 nations competed in ski jumping at the 2011 Asian Winter Games:

References

Normal Hill Individual
Large Hill Individual
Large Hill Team

External links
 Official website

 
Asian Winter Games
2011 Asian Winter Games events
2011